The Pacific temperate rainforests of western North America is the largest temperate rain forest region on the planet as defined by the World Wildlife Fund (other definitions exist). The Pacific temperate rainforests lie along the western side of the Pacific Coast Ranges along the Pacific Northwest Coast of North America from the Prince William Sound in Alaska through the British Columbia Coast to Northern California, and are part of the Nearctic realm, as also defined by the World Wildlife Fund.

This ecoregion is a subregion of the Cascadia bioregion.

These rainforests occur in a number of ecoregions, which vary in their species composition, but are predominantly of conifers, sometimes with an understory of broadleaf trees, ferns and shrubs. In the WWF's system, the ecoregions of the Pacific temperate rainforests are the Northern Pacific coastal forests, Haida Gwaii, British Columbia mainland coastal forests, Central Pacific coastal forests, Central and Southern Cascades forests, Klamath-Siskiyou forests, and Northern California coastal forests ecoregions.

The forests in the north contain predominantly Sitka spruce (Picea sitchensis) and western hemlock (Tsuga heterophylla), while those in the coastal forests are home to both species mentioned, as well as coast redwood (Sequoia sempervirens), coast Douglas-fir (Pseudotsuga menziesii), western redcedar (Thuja plicata) and shore pine (Pinus contorta).  Notably, many of the world's largest and tallest tree species are found in this ecoregion. Dense growths of epiphytes and mosses cover the trees, and lush vegetation is present everywhere.

Hardwood trees such as the bigleaf maple and the alder are also common, especially at lower elevations and along stream banks, and are vital to the ecosystem, in part because of their nitrogen fixing.

History

About 200 million years ago (during the Triassic and Jurassic periods), the landscape was dominated by conifers, which were the most diverse group of trees and constituted the greatest majority of large trees. When flowering plants emerged (in the following Cretaceous period), they quickly prevailed, causing most conifers to become extinct, and those that survived to adapt to harsh conditions. Perhaps the most significant difference in this change is that the primitive conifers invested their energy in the basic food supply for every seed, with no certainty of fertilization; by contrast, flowering plants create the food supply for a seed only after it is triggered by fertilization. The Pacific temperate rainforests now remains the only region on Earth of noteworthy size and significance where, due to unique climatic conditions, the conifers flourish as they did before being displaced by flowering plants. The northern Pacific temperate rain forests are relatively young, emerging in the past few thousand years following the retreat of the ice sheets of the last ice age.

Ecology

The ecosystem of Pacific temperate rainforests is so productive that the biomass on the best sites is at least four times greater than that of any comparable area in the tropics.  In sheer mass of living and decaying material - trees, mosses, shrubs, and soil - these forests are more massive than any other ecosystem on the planet. In part, this is due to the rarity of fire. Unlike drier forests, which burn periodically, temperate rain forests are naturally subject to only small-scale disturbances, such as blow-downs and avalanches.

This rain forest spans a wide range of latitude - from about 40 degrees north to about 60 degrees north. The differences in climate from south to north create several major forest zones, characterized by different species.
 At the southern limit in northern California is the "coast redwood zone".
 Beginning at the California/Oregon border, and extending through the north end of Vancouver Island is the "seasonal rain forest zone". The major tree species here are Douglas fir, western red cedar, Sitka spruce, and western hemlock.
 Beyond the northern end of Vancouver Island, is the "perhumid rain forest zone". Douglas fir wanes as a dominant species, and the forest is primarily made up of western red cedar, Sitka spruce, and western hemlock.
 The Gulf of Alaska begins where the fjords of southeast Alaska end, and marks the transition into "sub-polar rain forest". Here the forest occupies only a very narrow strip between the ocean and the icy alpine zone. The cedar trees no longer thrive in this harsher climate, and the dominant trees are limited to Sitka spruce, and western and mountain hemlock.
 The northern limits of the rainforest are scattered in thin bands in the northern Prince William Sound, Kenai Fjords, eastern Kodiak Island, and western Cook Inlet.

Wildlife
The first survey to systematically explore the forest canopy in the Carmanah Valley of Vancouver Island yielded 15,000 new species, a third of all invertebrates known to exist in all of Canada. Among the collection were 500 species previously unknown to science. Common individuals include raccoons, opossums, coyotes, black-tailed deer, ensatinas, red foxes, bullfrogs, banana slugs, Roosevelt elk, black slugs, shrew moles, gulls, mice, and numerous other organisms. Moose rarely set foot into these forests because they prefer colder, drier and snowier biomes which are most common in the inland Western United States compared to the coast, but small sightings of moose have been reported along the British Columbia coast.

The rain forest exists in a complicated landscape of islands and fjords, and many species depend on both the forest and the ocean. Salmon are one of the primary species of the rainforest, spawning in the forest streams. The marbled murrelet nests in old growth trees at night, but feeds in the ocean during the day.

Many of the most iconic photos of these forests include a large bear somewhere in the frame. Grizzly bears and black bears once thrived throughout the rain forest zone and beyond. Black bears can still be found throughout the forest's range, while grizzlies are largely confined to areas north of the Canada–US border. These forests have some of the largest concentrations of grizzly bears in the world, mainly due to the region's rich salmon streams. The Great Bear Rainforest in Canada is home to the rare white variant of the black bear known as the Kermode bear, also known colloquially as the "spirit bear." The endangered spotted owl was at the center of logging controversies in Oregon and Washington.  Other wildlife species of note include the bald eagle, marbled murrelet, wolf, mountain lion and sitka deer.

Logging
Pacific temperate rainforests have been subject to ongoing large-scale industrial logging since the end of World War II, cutting over half of their total area. In California, only 4% of the redwoods have been protected. In Oregon and Washington, less than 10% of the original coastal rainforest area remains.

An even larger percentage of the productive forest has been logged.  Much of the land is rock, ice, muskeg, or less productive forest on steep slopes. The stereotypical old growth is limited to lowland flats and valleys, which have been preferentially targeted for logging. Historically, the most common protocol has been to place protected areas in the mountains, leaving the valleys to the timber industry. So while some very large areas are protected as parks and monuments, very little of the highest-value habitat has been protected, and much of it has already been cut.

In the Tongass National Forest, in the 1950s, in part to aid in Japanese recovery from World War II, the US Forest Service set up long term contracts with two pulp mills: the Ketchikan Pulp Company (KPC) and the Alaska Pulp Company (APC). These contracts were for 50 years, and divided up the forest into areas slated for APC logs and areas slated for KPC logs. These two companies conspired to drive log prices down, conspired to drive smaller logging operations out of business, and were major and recalcitrant polluters of their local areas.  These long term contracts guaranteed low prices to the pulp companies — in some cases resulting in trees being given away for less than the price of a hamburger. Since 1980, the US Forest Service has lost over a billion dollars in Tongass timber sales.

Half a million acres (2,000 km2) of the Tongass was selected by native corporations under the 1971 Alaska Native Claims Settlement Act. Much of this area has been clearcut.

The most controversial timber sales in the Tongass are in the roadless areas. In September 2006, a landmark court decision overturned President George W. Bush's repeal of the Roadless Rule, reverting to the 2001 roadless area protections established under President Clinton.  However, the Tongass was exempted from that ruling and it is unclear what the fate of its vast roadless areas will be.

See also
 Olympic National Park
 Redwood National and State Parks

Notes

References
 Endangered Ecosystems of the United States: A Preliminary Assessment of Loss and Degradation
 Clearcutting Canada's Rainforest: Status Report 2005
 Temperate Rainforests of the Northern Pacific Coast

External links
 British Columbia's Rainforests Essays.
 Southeast Alaska Conservation Council
 Raincoast, B.C.
 http://www.canadianrainforests.org/
 Trust for Sustainable Forestry

 
Temperate coniferous forests of the United States
Temperate rainforests
Ecoregions of Canada
Ecoregions of the United States
Ecoregions of Alaska
Ecozones and ecoregions of British Columbia
Ecoregions of California
Fauna of the Northwestern United States

.Rainforest

Forests of Alaska
Forests of British Columbia
Forests of California
Forests of Oregon
Forests of Washington (state)
Coast of British Columbia
Plants by habitat
Plant communities of California
Plant communities of the West Coast of the United States
Nearctic ecoregions